Attoor Ravi Varma (27 December 1930 – 26 July 2019) was an Indian poet and translator of Malayalam literature. One of the pioneers of modern Malayalam poetry, Ravi Varma is a recipient of Kendra Sahitya Akademi Award, Kerala Sahitya Akademi Award for Poetry and Kerala Sahitya Akademi Award for Translation, besides many other honours. The Government of Kerala honoured him with their highest literary award, the Ezhuthachan Puraskaram, in 2012 and the Kerala Sahitya Akademi inducted him as their distinguished fellow in 2017.

Biography 
Attoor Ravi Varma was born on 27 December 1930 in Attoor, a small village in Trichur district of the erstwhile Kingdom of Cochin (now part of the south Indian state of Kerala) to Krishnan Namboothiri and Ammini Amma. He joined Zamorin's Guruvayurappan College, Calicut for his pre-university course but was expelled from college due to his involvement in left-wing politics. Later, he continued studies at Malabar Christian College before graduating in Malayalam with honours from the University College, Trivandrum. Subsequently, he joined Presidency College, Madras Malayalam department as a faculty where he had the opportunity to be in touch with M. Govindan, the noted writer, which helped him in the studies of Tamil language. He started his career as a teacher in Madras but returned to Kerala to work at Sree Neelakanta Government Sanskrit College Pattambi before joining the Brennen College, Tellicherry where prominent politicians Pinarayi Vijayan and A. K. Balan were his students. Ravi Varma was married to Sree Devi and the couple resided in Trichur. Ravi Varma died on 26 July 2019. He was 88 and was undergoing treatment for pneumonia in a private hospital in Trichur.

Legacy 
Ravi Varma's poems ignored the metre and used free verse and he was one among the group of poets who pioneered modernism in Malayalam literature. His oeuvre consists of several poems compiled under three anthologies, translation of four novels from Tamil which include two of Sundara Ramaswamy and one of Rajathi Salma, two books of translation of Tamil poetry and an edited work of poems of young writers. It was Ravi Varma who translated the Bhakthi poems on the Malayalam calendar in vattezhuthu script published by Moozhikulam Sala.

Awards and honours 
Attoor Ravi Varma received the Kerala Sahitya Akademi Award for Poetry for his poetry anthology, Attoor Ravi Varmayute Kavitakal in 1996 and he received the Asan Smaraka Kavitha Puraskaram in 1997, the same year as he received the Kerala Sahitya Akademi Award for Translation for Oru Pulimarathinte Katha, his translation of the debut novel by Sundara Ramaswamy. The Sahitya Akademi chose the anthology, Attoor Ravi Varmayute Kavitakal, for their annual award in 2001 and the second part of Attoor Ravi Varmayute Kavitakal fetched him the P. Kunhiraman Nair Award in 2005. The Government of Kerala honoured Ravi Varma with their highest literary award of Ezhuthachan Award in 2012 and three years later, he received the 2015 Vani Samnvay Distinguished Translator Award. The Kerala Sahitya Akademi inducted him as a distinguished fellow in 2017. He is also a recipient of the Sahitya Akademi Translation Prize by Kendra Sahitya Akademi, Premji Award, E. K. Divakaran Potti Award, Deviprasadam Trust Award (2010), and Mahakavi Pandalam Kerala Varma Kavitha Award. Maruvili is a documentary film made on the life and work of Ravi Varma, directed by Anvar Ali.

Bibliography

Poetry

Translation from Tamil to Malayalam 
 
 
 
 
 
 Bhakti kavyam (Translation of Nayanars and Azhvars)

Edited poems

References

External links

 
 

1930 births
2019 deaths
People from Thrissur district
Poets from Kerala
Malayalam-language writers
Malayalam poets
Recipients of the Sahitya Akademi Award in Malayalam
Recipients of the Kerala Sahitya Akademi Award
Recipients of the Ezhuthachan Award
University College Thiruvananthapuram alumni
20th-century Indian poets
Indian male poets
20th-century Indian novelists
21st-century Indian poets
Indian male novelists
20th-century Indian male writers
21st-century Indian male writers
Recipients of the Sahitya Akademi Prize for Translation